Iridopsis clivinaria, the mountain mahogany looper moth, is a moth of the  family Geometridae. It is found from British Columbia south to California and east to Idaho, Colorado and Arizona.

The length of the forewings is 22–25 mm. Adults have triangular forewing with a pale grey strip along the costa but medium brownish-grey in the lower and outer portions. They are on wing from March to July in one generation per year.

The larvae mainly feed on the leaves of Cercocarpus species and Purshia tridentata, but have also been recorded on Prunus species and Ceanothus velutinus. Young larvae skeletonise the leaves of their host plant. They are generally greyish-brown (although there are four colour morphs: black, gray, reddish, and yellow) and mimic twigs. Larvae can be found from July to August, after which they overwinter as a pupa in the soil.

Subspecies
Iridopsis clivinaria clivinaria
Iridopsis clivinaria impia Rindge, 1966
Iridopsis clivinaria profanata (Barnes & McDunnough, 1917)

References

Moths described in 1858
Boarmiini
Moths of North America